North Carolina's 19th House district is one of 120 districts in the North Carolina House of Representatives. It has been represented by Republican Charlie Miller since 2021.

Geography
Since 2021, the district has included parts of New Hanover and Brunswick counties. The district overlaps with the 7th and 8th Senate districts.

District officeholders since 1983

Multi-member district

Single-member district

Election results

2022

2020

2018

2016

2014

2012

2010

2008

2006

2004

2002

2000

References

North Carolina House districts
New Hanover County, North Carolina
Brunswick County, North Carolina